An der Schmücke is a town in the district Kyffhäuserkreis, in Thuringia, Germany. It was created with effect from 1 January 2019 by the merger of the former municipalities of Bretleben, Gorsleben, Hauteroda, Heldrungen, Hemleben and Oldisleben. Between 1993 and 2019, these municipalities were part of the Verwaltungsgemeinschaft ("collective municipality") An der Schmücke, which additionally contained the municipalities Etzleben and Oberheldrungen. The seat of the town and the former Verwaltungsgemeinschaft is in Heldrungen.

References

Former Verwaltungsgemeinschaften in Thuringia
States and territories established in 2019